Mount Parnassus (Parnassós) is a mountain range of central Greece that is and historically has been especially valuable to the Greek nation and the earlier Greek city-states for many reasons. In peace, it offers scenic views of the countryside, being a major international recreational site, with views of montane landscapes. Economically its rolling foothills and valleys host extensive  groves of olive, a cash crop marketed world-wide since prehistory. The mountain is also the location of historical, archaeological, and other cultural sites, such as Delphi perched on the southern slopes of the mountain in a rift valley north of the Gulf of Corinth.  Parnassus is laced with trails for hiking in the three warm seasons. In the winter the entire range is open to skiing, especially from the resorts of Arachova. Its melting snows are a source of municipal water to the surrounding communities. The mountain is composed of limestone, but also contains bauxite aluminum ore, which is mined and processed. In war, Parnassus has been a center of resistance if need be, providing cover and refuge to partisans.

Parnassus is mentioned in early Ancient Greek literature. Many of its ancient communities are cited in Homer's Iliad. From a linguistic point of view, it was home to states of the Dorians, such as the Phokians, who spoke a Doric dialect, Phokian. According to Greek mythology, this mountain was sacred to Dionysus and the Dionysian mysteries; it was also sacred to Apollo and the Corycian nymphs, and it was the home of the Muses.

However, there is a significant gap in the proto-history of the name, Parnassos. Mycenaean settlements were abundant to the south and east. They had good views of Parnassus, and climbed some part of it frequently, and yet the name remains unattested in what is known of their language, Mycenaean Greek, which is written in Linear B script.

The name of Parnassus
L. Palmer, a philologist, suggested that Parnassus is a name derived from Luwian language, one of the Anatolian languages. In his view, the name derives from parnassas, the possessive adjective of the Luwian word parna meaning house, or specifically temple, so the name effectively means the mountain of the house of the god. Such a derivation, being consistent with the reputation of the mountain as being a holy one, where the power of divinity is manifested, has always been considered a strong one, even by critics of the theory. Palmer goes on to postulate that some pre-Greek people were Anatolian, perhaps from an earlier wave of conquest, and that their country and facilities were taken by the proto-Greeks.

The consistency, however, ends there. With regard to a possible preponderance of evidence, this one word remains an isolate. There is no historical or archaeological evidence to tie the name to an Anatolian presence. G. Mylonas reviewing the possibilities found nothing at all to tie the archaeology around the mountain to anything Anatolian, and although a probable Cretan connection has been detected, there is nothing to tie the Cretans to the Luwians. Linear A, the script of the Minoans, as the Cretans have been called, remains yet undeciphered. In summary, t he ethnicity of the pre-Greek people or peoples after many decades of scholarship remains yet unknown, and there is yet no explanation of how and when this mountain was named with a Luwian name.

Geology and geography
Parnassus is one of the largest mountainous regions of Mainland Greece and one of the highest Greek mountains. It spreads over three municipalities, namely Boeotia, Phthiotis and Phocis, where its largest part lies. Its altitude is 2,457 meters and its highest peak is Liakouras. To the northwest it is connected to Mount Giona and to the south to Kirphe.

The mountain is delimited to the east by the valley of the Boeotian Kephissus and to the west by the valley of Amfissa. An unusual geological feature of Parnassus is its rich deposits of bauxite, which has led to their systematic mining since the end of the 1930s, resulting in ecological damage to part of the mountain.

Mythology

Mount Parnassus is named after Parnassos, son of the nymph Kleodora and the man Kleopompus. A city of which Parnassos was leader was flooded by torrential rains. The citizens ran from the flood, following the howling of wolves, up the mountain slope. There the survivors built another city and called it Lykoreia, which in Greek means "the howling of the wolves." While Orpheus was living with his mother and his eight beautiful aunts on Parnassus, he met Apollo, who was courting the laughing muse Thalia. Becoming fond of Orpheus, Apollo gave him a little golden lyre and taught him to play it. Orpheus's mother taught him to write verses for singing. As the Oracle of Delphi was sacred to the god Apollo, so did the mountain itself become associated with Apollo. According to some traditions, Parnassus was the site of the fountain Castalia and the home of the Muses; according to other traditions, that honor fell to Mount Helicon, another mountain in the same range. As the home of the Muses, Parnassus became known as the home of poetry, music, and learning.

Parnassus was also the site of several unrelated minor events in Greek mythology.
In some versions of the Greek flood myth, the ark of Deucalion comes to rest on the slopes of Parnassus. This is the version of the myth recounted in Ovid's Metamorphoses.
Orestes spent his time in hiding on Mount Parnassus.
Parnassus was sacred to the god Dionysus.
The Corycian Cave, located on the slopes of Parnassus, was sacred to Pan and to the Muses.
In Book 19 of The Odyssey, Odysseus recounts a story of how he was gored in the thigh during a boar hunt on Mount Parnassus in his youth.

Parnassus was also the home of Pegasus, the winged horse of Bellerophon.

As metaphor

This relation of the mountain to the Muses offered an instigation for its "mystification" by the poetic-artistic Parnassism movement, established in France in the decade of 1866 to 1876 as a reaction to Romanticism. Parnassism was characterized by a return to some classicistic elements and belief in the doctrine of "Art for the Art", first articulated by Theophile Gautier. The periodical Modern Parnassus, issued by Catul Mendes and Xavier Ricard, contained direct references to Mt. Parnassus and its mythological feature as habitation of the Muses. The Parnassists, who did not exceed a group of twenty poets, exercised a relatively strong influence on the cultural life of Paris, particularly due to their tenacity on perfection of rhyme and vocabulary.  Parnassism influenced several French poets, but it also exercised an influence on modern Greek poets, particularly Kostis Palamas and Gryparis.

The name of the mountain (Mont Parnasse) was given to a quarter of Paris on the left bank of the Seine, where artists and poets used to  gather and recite their poems in public. Montparnasse is nowadays one of the most renowned quarters of the city, and in its cemetery many personalities of the arts and culture are buried.

Parnassus figures earlier in Jonathan Swift's The Battle of the Books (1697) as the site of an ideological war between the ancients and the moderns.

National Park
The National Park of Parnassus was founded in 1938. The idea behind the park was to preserve the natural habitat, for which it was necessary to govern the disposition of its natural resources. However, the park did not include all the terrain considered to be in the range. The highest peaks were omitted.

Within a few years the park aspect of the land became dormant as Greece turned its attention toward ending the German occupation, and then after World War II, settling the Greek Civil War. Parnassus was in a unique position to serve as a center for resistance, as it had for the Greek war of independence. Battles were fought in the valleys surrounding the range.

When the wars were over and the region went back to being an active park the new science of ecology brought changes to the park administration. Species were inventoried, endemic and endangered ones were identified, and the concept of a protected area was established. Parnassus National Park became a protected area for birds under the "Birds Directive." Subsequently, it acquired other protections under other laws as required by the EU. After 2000 it became Oros Parnassos, "Mount Parnassus," Natura 2000 protected area ID GR2410002. The two are not exactly identical.

Among the endemic flora species under protection are the Cephalonian fir tree and the Parnassian peony (Paeonia parnassica). In the Park are to be found birds of prey, wolves, boars, badgers, and weasels.

Parnassos Ski Resort

The slopes of Mount Parnassus are composed of two ski sections, Kellaria and Fterolakka, which together make up the largest ski center in Greece. A smaller ski center (only two drag lifts) called Gerontovrahos is across a ridge from Kellaria. Parnassus is mined for its abundant supply of bauxite which is converted to aluminium oxide and then to aluminium.

The construction of the ski resort started in 1975 and was completed in 1976, when the first two drag lifts operated in Fterolaka. In 1981 the construction of a new ski area was completed in Kelaria, while in winter season 1987–1988 the chair lift Hermes started operating and connected the two ski areas. Both ski resorts continued expanding and in 1993 the first high-speed quad in Greece was installed, named Hercules. In 2014–2015 two new hybrid lifts were installed along with a new eight-seater, replacing the old infrastructure.

Today the Ski Center operates with 16 lifts, two hybrid ski lifts which combine an eight-seater Cabin and a six-seater chair, an eight-seater Cabin, a 4-seater chair lift, a 2-seater chair lift, 6 drag lifts and four baby lifts.

See also
 List of mountains in Greece

References

External links

  Greek Mountain Flora
 "Óros Parnassos, Greece" on Peakbagger
 

 
Locations in Greek mythology
Two-thousanders of Greece
National parks of Greece
Ski areas and resorts in Greece
Mountains of Central Greece
Mountains of Greece
Sacred mountains
Tourist attractions in Central Greece
Landforms of Phocis
Natura 2000 in Greece